Saša Martinović (born 15 July 1991) is a Croatian chess grandmaster. He earned his IM title in 2008, and his GM title in 2011.

Chess career
He won the 2014 Zagreb Open, the 2016 Split Chess Open and in 2020 won the Croatian Chess Championship, finishing on 7/11.

He qualified for the Chess World Cup 2021, where he defeated Kaido Kulaots 1½-½ in the first round, before losing 2-0 to World Champion Magnus Carlsen in the second round.

References

External links

Saša Martinović chess games at 365Chess.com

1991 births
Croatian chess players
Chess grandmasters
Living people